Cabin in the Sky is the tenth studio album by American post-punk band Tuxedomoon, released on July 20, 2004 by Cramboy.

Track listing

Personnel 
Adapted from the Cabin in the Sky liner notes.

Tuxedomoon
 Steven Brown – alto saxophone, soprano saxophone, clarinet, keyboards, piano, vocals
 Peter Dachert (as Peter Principle) – bass guitar, electric guitar, drum programming, percussion, backing vocals, recording, mixing
 Luc Van Lieshout – trumpet, flugelhorn, harmonica
 Blaine L. Reininger – violin, viola, guitar, synthesizer, drum programming, vocals
Additional musicians
 Marc Collin – programming (1, 2, 4, 7, 8, 11, 12)
 DJ Hell – programming (7, 12)
 Bruce Geduldig – backing vocals

Production and additional personnel
 Aksak Maboul – additional programming and  mixing (8)
 Coti – production, recording, mixing
 Isabelle Corbisier – photography
 Hanna Gorjaczkowska – art direction
 Marc Hollander – assistant mixing
 Vincent Kenis – assistant mixing, mastering, engineering (8)
 John McEntire – mixing (12)
 Ian Simmonds – production and mixing (8)
 Tarwater – production and mixing (13)
 Tuxedomoon – production, arrangement
 Alan Ward – mastering

Release history

References

External links 
 

2004 albums
Tuxedomoon albums
Crammed Discs albums